This is a list of yearly Northeast Conference football standings.

Northeast Conference standings

References

Northeast Conference
Standings